Andrea Marconi (born 24 May 1985) is an Italian footballer who plays for Italian club Folgore Caratese.

Biography

Youth career
Born in Milan, Lombardy, Marconi started his career at Milanese club Aldini. In July 2002, along with 5 other youth players, they were signed by one of the two Serie A club of Milan city – A.C. Milan. Marconi was the member of the under-18 youth team in 2002–03 season; he was promoted to the under-20 reserve in 2003–04.

Pergocrema
In 2004 Marconi left for Serie D (fifth division; non-professional) club Pergocrema, where he won promotion to 2005–06 Serie C2 as well as promotion to 2008–09 Lega Pro Prima Divisione.

Pro Vercelli
In 2010 Marconi was signed by Pro Vercelli in co-ownership deal, where he won promotion to 2011–12 Lega Pro Prima Divisione. In June 2011 the club acquired Marconi outright in 2-year contract. The club won promotion again to 2012–13 Serie B.

After only 6 appearances in the second division, on 23 January 2013 Marconi joined the fourth division club Venezia. Marconi won promotion back to Serie B again with Pro Vercelli in 2014. He wore no.2 shirt for the new season. However, he failed to play any more Serie B game. On 26 January 2015 Marconi was signed by Calcio Como in another temporary deal. Marconi started in the first 2 games of promotion playoffs. He was an unused bench against Matera in the second leg.

References

External links
 Lega Serie B profile 

Italian footballers
A.C. Milan players
U.S. Pergolettese 1932 players
F.C. Pro Vercelli 1892 players
Venezia F.C. players
Como 1907 players
Serie B players
Association football midfielders
Footballers from Milan
1985 births
Living people